Sameer Jawdat (born 8 October 1965) is an archer from the Saudi Arabia.

Jawdat represent the Saudi Arabia at the 1988 Summer Olympics held in Seoul, South Korea, where he competed in the men's individual archery, where he finished in 82 place.

References

1965 births
Living people
Saudi Arabian male  archers
Olympic archers of Saudi Arabia
Archers at the 1988 Summer Olympics